Igor Nikolayevich Zhelezovski or Ihar Mikałajevič Žalazoŭski (1 July 1963 – 12 June 2021) was a Soviet and Belarusian speed skater.

Biography
His imposing physical appearance resulted in the nicknames "Igor the Terrible" and "The bear from Minsk". Originally competing for the Soviet Union, then for the Commonwealth of Independent States, and finally for Belarus, he became World Sprint Champion a record six times. In Soviet times, he trained at Armed Forces sports society in Minsk.

Zhelezovski won silver at the World Junior Allround Championships in 1982. Specialising in the sprint, he became World Sprint Champion in 1985, 1986, 1989, 1991, 1992, and 1993. He finished eighth in the 1987 edition, and decided to skip the 1988 edition in favour of preparing for the Winter Olympics in Calgary that same year. These, however, turned out to be a disappointment for him, finishing sixth in the 500 m, only third in 1000 m, and fourth in the 1500 m. In the remaining two World Sprint Championships he participated in, in 1990 and 1994, he finished third and sixth, respectively.

In his final two seasons, which followed the dissolution of the Soviet Union, Zhelezovski represented Belarus. It was during this time that he achieved a career highlight of winning the silver medal in the 1000 m event at the 1994 Winter Olympics in Lillehammer, Norway. At the opening ceremony of the 1994 Winter Olympics, he was the Belarusian flag bearer.

After ending his skating career in 1994, Zhelezovski became president of the skating union of Belarus, a position which he held for several years.

Zhelezovski died on 12 June 2021, at the age of 57.

Medals

An overview of medals won by Zhelezovski at important championships he participated in, listing the years in which he won each:

Records

World records 
Over the course of his career, Zhelezovski skated four world records, one of which equalled Pavel Pegov's six-year-old world record on the 1000 m:

Source: SpeedSkatingStats.com

Personal records
To put these personal records in perspective, the WR column lists the official world records on the dates that Zhelezovski skated his personal records.

Source: SpeedskatingResults.com

Note that Zhelezovski's personal record on the 500 m was not recognised as a world record by the International Skating Union (ISU).

Zhelezovski has an Adelskalender score of 164.015 points.

References

External links 
 

 
 Personal records from Jakub Majerski's Speedskating Database
 
 Results of Championships of Russia and the USSR from SpeedSkating.ru 
 

1963 births
2021 deaths
People from Orsha
Soviet male speed skaters
Belarusian male speed skaters
Olympic speed skaters of the Soviet Union
Olympic bronze medalists for the Soviet Union
Olympic speed skaters of the Unified Team
Olympic speed skaters of Belarus
Olympic silver medalists for Belarus
Olympic medalists in speed skating
Speed skaters at the 1988 Winter Olympics
Speed skaters at the 1992 Winter Olympics
Speed skaters at the 1994 Winter Olympics
Medalists at the 1988 Winter Olympics
Medalists at the 1994 Winter Olympics
Spartak athletes
World record setters in speed skating
World Sprint Speed Skating Championships medalists
Deaths from the COVID-19 pandemic in Belarus
Sportspeople from Vitebsk Region